International Socialist League can refer to:

International Socialist League (South Africa), a former syndicalist group
International Socialist League (UK), a Trotskyist party
International Socialist League (2019), an international organization established in Barcelona in 2019